Hidden Harvest is a 2014 book by Canadian author Mark Coakley that depicts an illegal drug conspiracy in Canada that was involved in the creation of a gigantic cannabis garden in Barrie, Ontario, concealed inside an abandoned Molson beer factory. The Toronto Star called Hidden Harvest "thoroughly researched, entertaining … real, sometimes humorous and very Canadian"; a review in Toronto's Now was sub-titled, "Buy the Book". On June 16, 2014, Coakley was interviewed on CBC Radio's The Current about Hidden Harvest.

See also
 List of books about cannabis

References

External links 
 Publisher's website
 Author's website

2014 non-fiction books
Books about Ontario
Non-fiction books about cannabis
Non-fiction crime books
2014 in cannabis
Cannabis cultivation
Works about cannabis trafficking
Cannabis in Ontario
Barrie
Canadian books about cannabis
ECW Press books